Robbie O'Malley (born 19 July 1965 in Laytown, County Meath) is an Irish former Gaelic footballer. He played for his local club St Colmcille's and was a senior member of the Meath county team from 1984 until 1995.

References

 

1965 births
Living people
Leinster inter-provincial Gaelic footballers
Meath inter-county Gaelic footballers
St Colmcille's Laytown Gaelic footballers
Texaco Footballers of the Year
Winners of two All-Ireland medals (Gaelic football)